Columbia Hall, commonly known as Paresis Hall, was a brothel and gay bar located in the Bowery, in New York City, in the 1890s. Located on the Bowery near Cooper Union, the Hall was owned by the gangster James T. Ellison.

Name
Paresis Hall took its common nickname from general paresis, a term for syphilitic insanity.

Jennie June wrote that the name "Paresis Hall" was the popular name, but androgynes disliked that name, and instead referred to it as "the Hall". June wrote that the term paresis was used as a general term for insanity, but also wrote that the name followed a superstition that androgynes could cause virile men to succumb to insanity, later discovered to be a side effect of advanced syphilis.

Floors
On the ground floor, Paresis Hall had a small bar room in front, and a small beer garden behind it. The two floors above the ground floor were rented out in small rooms.

Cercle Hermaphroditos
One floor was permanently held by the Cercle Hermaphroditos, an early transgender advocacy organization. They stored clothing there due to the illegality of and public hostility to dressing in women's clothing.

According to historian Susan Stryker, the Cercle Hermaphroditos was the first group in the United States to be concerned with what today would be considered transgender social justice issues.

Opposition
Paresis Hall was particularly renowned and reviled even at the time, and was a common target for both police activity and religious protests. Despite this, evidence suggests it was active until at least 1899.

See also

 Cross-dressing#Legal issues
 LGBT culture in New York City

References

Bibliography

External links
 Historical Marker Database: Paresis Hall

Brothels in New York (state)
Defunct LGBT drinking establishments in New York City
Defunct LGBT nightclubs in New York (state)
LGBT places in the United States